Sir Charles Fergusson Roxburgh  (born 25 October 1959) is a British civil servant who was Second Permanent Secretary of HM Treasury from 2016 to 2022.

Early life and career
Roxburgh was born on 25 October 1959 and educated at Stowe School. He obtained a degree in Classics from Trinity College, Cambridge. 

Roxburgh began his career at the accountancy firm Arthur Andersen & Co in its Management Consulting Division. He graduated from Harvard Business School with a Master of Business Administration in 1986.

Career
Roxburgh worked at the management consulting firm McKinsey & Co for 26 years, including as a senior partner. His roles at the firm included co-head of the global strategy practice, head of the UK financial institutions group and leader of the global corporate and investment banking practice. He worked in McKinsey & Co's New York City financial institutions practice for seven years. In 2009 he became the London-based director of the McKinsey Global Institute, an in-house economics research unit. In 2011 he was elected to McKinsey & Co's global board.

Roxburgh joined HM Treasury in February 2013. He was Director General of Financial Services at the Treasury from 2013. He sat on the Financial Stability Board and represented the Treasury on the Bank of England's Financial Policy Committee. On 4 July 2016 he was appointed Second Permanent Secretary of the Treasury, overseeing its growth, financial services and infrastructure agendas. He worked on completing the Government's exit from its ownership of financial assets. He was involved in Brexit, and COVID-19 emergency schemes such as the Covid Corporate Financing Facility. He oversaw the creation of the UK Infrastructure Bank.

In May 2022, The Sunday Times reported that Roxburgh would stand down as Second Permament Secretary of the Treasury later in the year.

Personal life
Roxburgh is married to the diplomat Karen Pierce. They have two sons, born in 1991 and 1997.

Honours
Roxburgh was appointed Knight Commander of the Order of the Bath (KCB) in the 2022 Birthday Honours for services to Government.

References

1959 births
Living people
People educated at Stowe School
Harvard Business School alumni
Alumni of Trinity College, Cambridge
Second Permanent Secretaries of HM Treasury
Knights Commander of the Order of the Bath